The 2005–06 Croatian Ice Hockey League season was the 15th season of the Croatian Ice Hockey League, the top level of ice hockey in Croatia. Four teams participated in the league, and KHL Medveščak Zagreb won the championship.

Regular season

Playoffs

Semifinal 
 KHL Mladost Zagreb – KHL Zagreb 2:1 (5:6, 6:2, 4:3 n.V.)

Final
 KHL Medveščak Zagreb – KHL Mladost Zagreb 3:0 (5:4, 7:3, 8:4)

External links
 Season on hockeyarchives.info

Croatian Ice Hockey League
Croatian Ice Hockey League seasons
1